Diggi village is located in Malpura tehsil of Tonk district, Rajasthan, India.

References

Villages in Tonk district